The Magazine City Hall-Jail is a historic government building at the northwest corner of Garland and Priddy Streets in Magazine, Arkansas.  It is a single-story masonry structure, built out of rusticated concrete blocks and covered by a gable roof. The gable ends are framed in wood.  The rear portion of the building, housing the jail cells, has a flat roof.  It was built in 1934, with the concrete blocks formed by a local mason to resemble ashlar stone.  It is the only local municipal building built out these materials, and was used for its original purposes into the 1980s.

The building was listed on the National Register of Historic Places in 1993.

See also
National Register of Historic Places listings in Logan County, Arkansas

References

Jails on the National Register of Historic Places in Arkansas
National Register of Historic Places in Logan County, Arkansas
Government buildings completed in 1934
Buildings and structures in Logan County, Arkansas
City and town halls on the National Register of Historic Places in Arkansas
1934 establishments in Arkansas